Consorzio per le Autostrade Siciliane (English: Consortium for the Sicilian Highways) is an Italian company that manages two motorways in Sicily: A18 and A20.

Managed routes 
 A20 Messina-Palermo - 181,8 km
 A18 Messina-Catania - 76,8 km
 A18 Siracusa-Gela - 41,9 km

The total managed is 300.5 km.

Fotogallery

Related pages
 Autostrade per l'Italia
 ANAS
 Giap (fuels)

References

Transport companies of Italy
Companies based in Sicily
Construction and civil engineering companies established in 1997
Road authorities
Italian companies established in 1997
Construction and civil engineering companies of Italy